Pingxi District (also spelled Pinghsi), is a rural district in New Taipei, Taiwan. The source of the Keelung River is in Jingtong, which is inside Pingxi District. It was an important coal mining town in the early 20th century. Its population of 4,253 as of February 2023 is the smallest among the districts of New Taipei City.

Tourist attractions
 Sky Lantern Festival:  In Pingxi, every year during the Lantern Festival, people have their wishes written on sky lanterns, and release them to the skies during the Pingxi International Sky Lantern Festival.
 Jingtong Coal Memorial Park
 Jingtong Mining Industry Museum
 Lingjiao Waterfall
 Shifen Waterfall
 Taiwan Coal Mine Museum
 Jingtong Old Street
 Shifen Old Street

Transportation

Pingxi is served by the Pingxi Line of Taiwan Railways, which includes:
 Dahua Station
 Shifen Station
 Wanggu Station
 Lingjiao Station
 Pingxi Station
 Jingtong Station

Notable natives
 Lin Hung-chih, member of Legislative Yuan (2005–2016)

See also

 New Taipei

References

External links 

  

Districts of New Taipei